Brachymonas is a genus of gram-negative, aerobic bacteria.

References

Comamonadaceae
Bacteria genera